The 5th Open Russian Festival of Animated Film was held in from Feb. 10-14 in 2000 at a boarding house called "Birch Grove" two kilometres from the town of Tarusa, Russia.  Animated works from the past three years from the Russian Federation were accepted. Along with auteur films, commercial reels, music clips and television bumpers were in competition. There was also a two-minute pilot for The Nutcracker and the Mouse King, a feature film finally released in 2004, and Optimus Mundus, a feature film consisting of 50 independently directed short films about Moscow.

The jury prizes were handed out by profession, with some prizes tailored to the films in competition. No Grand Prix was given out this year. Also, any member or guest of the festival was able to vote for their favourite film.

Jury

Jury prizes

Rating (by audience vote)
Each member of the audience was asked to list their top 5 five films of the festival.  5 points were given for a 1st place vote and so on, down to 1 point for a 5th place vote.

External links
Official website with the results 
Full list of competing films 
Article about the festival 

Anim
Open Russian Festival of Animated Film
2000 in animation
2000 film festivals
2000 festivals in Asia
2000 festivals in Europe